Lycothrissa crocodilus, the sabretooth thryssa, is a species of anchovy which occurs in fresh and brackish water in Southeast Asia.  It is the only species in its genus.

References

Anchovies
Monotypic ray-finned fish genera
Fish of Asia
Taxa named by Albert Günther
Fish described in 1851